The 1970 VMI Keydets football team was an American football team that represented the Virginia Military Institute (VMI) as a member of the Southern Conference (SoCon) during the 1970 NCAA University Division football season. In their fifth year under head coach Vito Ragazzo, the team compiled an overall record of 1–10 with a mark of 1–4 in conference play, placing last in the SoCon.

Schedule

References

VMI
VMI Keydets football seasons
VMI Keydets football